Michael Omar Owens Gaona (born 24 June 2003) is a Peruvian footballer who plays as a right winger for Peruvian Primera División club Academia Cantolao.

Career statistics

Club

Notes

References

2003 births
Living people
Peruvian footballers
Association football midfielders
Academia Deportiva Cantolao players
Footballers from Lima
American soccer players